Arthur Lee Ewoldt (January 8, 1894 – December 8, 1977) was an American Major League Baseball infielder. He played for the Philadelphia Athletics during the  season.

References

Major League Baseball infielders
Philadelphia Athletics players
Baseball players from Iowa
People from O'Brien County, Iowa
1894 births
1977 deaths